And Sudden Death is a 1936 American drama film directed by Charles Barton and written by Joseph Moncure March. The film stars Randolph Scott, Frances Drake, and Tom Brown; with supporting actors Billy Lee, Fuzzy Knight, Terry Walker and Porter Hall. The film was released on June 16, 1936, by Paramount Pictures.

Plot
Betty Winslow and others in her family are reckless drivers, and Lt. Knox of the police is determined to make her change her ways after repeated traffic violations. Betty eventually reforms, but when drunken brother Jackie gets behind the wheel of a car and causes an accident, Betty takes the blame and goes to prison.

Jackie's guilty conscience ultimately gets the better of him, freeing Betty to get on with her life, as well as a romantic future with Lt. Knox.

Cast 
Randolph Scott as Police Lt. James Knox
Frances Drake as Betty Winslow
Tom Brown as Jackie Winslow
Billy Lee as Bobby Sanborn
Fuzzy Knight as Steve Bartlett
Terry Walker as Bangs
Porter Hall as District Attorney
Charles Quigley as Mike Andrews
Joe Sawyer as Police Sgt. Sanborn 
Oscar Apfel as Defense Counsel
Maidel Turner as Dodie Sloan
Charles Arnt as Archie Sloan
Jimmy Conlin as Mr. Tweets
John Hyams as J.R. Winslow
Herbert Evans as Meggs
Don Rowan as Police Sgt. Malone
Wilma Francis as Nurse
 William Ingersoll as Judge

References

External links 
 

1936 films
1930s English-language films
American drama films
1936 drama films
Paramount Pictures films
Films directed by Charles Barton
American black-and-white films
1930s American films